Daniel Catenacci (born March 9, 1993) is a Canadian-Italian professional ice hockey centre who is currently playing with HC Pustertal Wölfe in the ICE Hockey League (ICEHL). He has formerly played in the National Hockey League (NHL) with the Buffalo Sabres and New York Rangers.

Playing career

Junior 
Catenacci was selected first overall by the Sault Ste. Marie Greyhounds in the 2009 Ontario Hockey League Draft from the York Simcoe Express minor midget AAA team.

After two seasons with the Greyhounds, he was traded to the Owen Sound Attack in August 2011 in exchange for Andrew Fritsch, Michael Schumacher and a second-round draft pick.

Professional 
Catenacci was drafted in the third round, 77th overall, by the Buffalo Sabres in the 2011 NHL Entry Draft. He made his professional debut with the Rochester Americans during the 2013 American Hockey League playoffs. During the 2013-2014 season, Catenacci also competed for Rochester in the 2013 Spengler Cup, scoring one goal in the quarterfinal.

On February 5, 2016, Catenacci was recalled from the minors by the Sabres. He made his debut with the Sabres the next night in a game against the Boston Bruins. In his third game, against the Philadelphia Flyers, Catenacci was injured by a check from Radko Gudas. After spending a week on the injured reserve list, Catenacci was reassigned to Rochester on February 19. On March 1, 2016, Catenacci was once again recalled by the Sabres. He finished the season playing in 11 games with Buffalo, scoring no points.

During the 2016–17 season, Catenacci was dealt by the Sabres at the trade deadline to the New York Rangers in exchange for defenseman Mat Bodie on February 28, 2017.

As a free agent from the Rangers, following parts of two seasons with the club, Catenacci left North America after his first 6 professional seasons in agreeing to a one-year contract with Italian club, HCB South Tyrol of the EBEL on July 19, 2018. He conitued playing at the club until the end of season 2021/22. In April 2022 HC Pustertal announced the signing of Catenacci.

Career statistics

Regular season and playoffs

International

References

External links 

1993 births
Living people
Bolzano HC players
Buffalo Sabres draft picks
Buffalo Sabres players
Canadian ice hockey centres
Hartford Wolf Pack players
New York Rangers players
Owen Sound Attack players
HC Pustertal Wölfe players
Rochester Americans players
Sault Ste. Marie Greyhounds players
Sportspeople from Richmond Hill, Ontario